Reine Ngotala (born October 5, 1997 in Nyanga, Gabon) is a Gabonese model and beauty pageant titleholder who was crowned Miss Gabon 2015 and represented Gabon at the Miss World 2015 but Unplaced.

Personal life
Ngotala is an economic student at the l'Institut Supérieur d'Ingénierie in Libreville.

Miss Gabon 2015
On April 26, 2015 Ngotala was crowned Miss Gabon 2015 which featured eighteen contestants who competed at the pageant. As Miss Gabon 2015, Ngotala represented Gabon at the Miss World 2015.

Reine Ngotala who crowned Miss Gabon actually scheduled to compete at the Miss Universe and Miss World before Miss Universe announced the official schedule. Reine only competed at the Miss World instead. Her runner-up, Anis Christine Pitty Yaya took the title to compete at the Miss Universe 2015.

References

Links 
Official Miss Gabon Facebook

1997 births
Living people
Gabonese beauty pageant winners
Miss World 2015 delegates